Roes may refer to:

People
 Alexander of Roes (died after 1288)
 Geoff Roes (born 1976), American ultra-marathon runner
 Georges Roes (1889–1945), French sport shooter
 Michael Roes (born 1960), German writer and filmmaker
 Peter Roes (born 1964), Belgian racing cyclist
 Raykeea Raeen-Roes, also known as Angel Haze (born 1991), American rapper and singer
 Sven Roes (born 1999), Dutch short track speed skater

Places
 Roes, Rhineland-Palatinate, Germany
 Roes Spring, United States